Synempora is a genus of moths in the family Neopseustidae.

Species
Synempora andesae Davis & Nielsen, 1980

External links
Systematics and Zoogeography of the Family Neopseustidae with the Proposal of a New Superfamily (Lepidoptera: Neopseustoidea)

Neopseustidae
Moth genera
Glossata genera
Taxa named by Ebbe Nielsen